Hastula colorata is a species of sea snail, a marine gastropod mollusk in the family Terebridae, the auger snails.

This is a taxon inquirendum. It is possibly a species of Columbellidae according to Terryn (2007).

References

Terebridae
Gastropods described in 1988